My Kind of Country is the eighth studio album by American country music singer Reba McEntire, released October 15, 1984. It was her second studio album for MCA Records. My Kind of Country peaked at No. 13 on Billboard's (North America) Country Music Albums chart. Two tracks from the album rose to No. 1 on the Country Singles chart: "How Blue" and "Somebody Should Leave".

The track "It's Not Over (If I'm Not over You)" was later recorded by the singer Mark Chesnutt on his 1992 album Longnecks & Short Stories, with backing vocals from Alison Krauss and Vince Gill. It reappeared on his 1997 album Thank God for Believers, from which it was released as a single in 1998.

Track listing

Personnel 
 Reba McEntire – lead and backing vocals
 David Briggs – keyboards
 Mitch Humphries – keyboards
 Kenny Bell – acoustic guitar
 Jimmy Capps – acoustic guitar
 Ray Edenton – acoustic guitar
 Bobby Thompson – acoustic guitar
 Greg Galbraith – electric guitar
 Brent Rowan – electric guitar
 Paul Worley – electric guitar
 Jerry Douglas – dobro
 Sonny Garrish – steel guitar
 Doyle Grisham – steel guitar
 Johnny Gimble – fiddle
 Mark O'Connor – fiddle
 Joe Osborn – bass guitar
 Larry Paxton – bass guitar
 Bob Wray – bass guitar
 Eddie Bayers – drums
 Jerry Kroon – drums
 Craig Bickhardt – backing vocals
 Buddy Cannon – backing vocals
 Ted Hewitt – backing vocals
 Wendy Waldman – backing vocals

Production 
 Harold Shedd – producer
 Jim Cotton – first engineer, overdub recording
 Bob Bullock – second engineer, overdub recording 
 George W. Clinton – second engineer, overdub recording 
 Paul Goldberg – second engineer, overdub recording
 Tim Kish – second engineer, overdub recording
 Joe Scaife – second engineer, overdub recording
 Ron Treat – mixing, overdub recording
 Glenn Meadows – mastering 
 Simon Levy – art direction, design  
 Alan Messer – photography

Studios
 Recorded at The Music Mill (Nashville, Tennessee).
 Mixed and Overdubbed at GroundStar Laboratories (Nashville, Tennessee).
 Mastered at Masterfonics (Nashville, Tennessee).

Charts

Weekly charts

Year-end charts

Singles

Certifications

References 

 

1984 albums
Reba McEntire albums
MCA Records albums
Albums produced by Harold Shedd